Padmanee Sharma (born June 26, 1970) is an immunologist and oncologist at the University of Texas MD Anderson Cancer Center in Houston, Texas. She holds the position of professor of genitourinary medical oncology and immunology in the Division of Cancer Medicine where she specializes in renal, prostate, and bladder cancers.

Research 
Sharma studies the treatment of cancer with immunotherapy. Her doctoral work demonstrated that cells expressing thymus-leukemia (TL) on their surface could be recognized by the Immune system and killed. In 2003, she was the lead author on a study of another tumor antigen, NY-ESO-1 in bladder cancer. She won an ASCO Young Investigator Award in 2003 to pursue this work.

Education 
 BA, Biology: Boston University (1990)
 MA, Biotechnology: Boston University (1991)
 MD, Medicine: Pennsylvania State University, Hershey, PA (1998)
 PhD, Immunology: Pennsylvania State University, Hershey, PA (1998)
 Clinical Residency in Internal Medicine: Cornell Medical Center-New York Hospital (2000)
 Clinical Fellowship in Medical Oncology: Memorial Sloan Kettering Cancer Center (2004)

Honors 
 2018 William B. Coley Award for Distinguished Research in Tumor Immunology
 2008 Prostate Cancer Foundation Challenge Award
 2003 ASCO Young Investigator Award
 2002 Doris Duke Clinical Scientist Development Award

Personal life 
Sharma was born June 26, 1970 in Guyana. She is married to longtime collaborator, James P. Allison and has three daughters from a previous marriage.

References 

1970 births
Living people
University of Texas MD Anderson Cancer Center
Boston University College of Arts and Sciences alumni
Penn State College of Medicine alumni
American people of Guyanese descent